Black Eagle of Santa Fe is a 1965 West German and Italian international co-production western film directed by Alberto Cardone and Ernst Hofbauer.

Story
Ranch workers disguised as soldiers murder Indians in order to stir up trouble with the whites so the rancher can claim their land.

Plot 
Landowner Morton wants to expand his property because he knows about oil deposits under the Indian territory. Settlers also come to the area, as a peace treaty with the Comanches provides security. Disguised as soldiers, Morton has his men attack the Indians. Black Eagle, the chief of the Comanche, then digs up the hatchet. After a bloody raid, the village's surviving settlers seek shelter in the nearby fort of Captain Jackson and his men. Due to the peace treaty, however, the fort is undermanned and Jackson is unable to act. He hires trapper Clint McPherson to investigate the cause of the Indian uprising, uncovering Morton's deceitful plan, which he tells Black Eagle. He and the Indians arrive at the fort just in time to assist the soldiers and settlers against the attack by Morton's men.

Production
Jack Lewis recalled that Ron Ormond asked him to write a draft of a script based on a magazine story called Fort Disaster adding Indians, cavalry and Frank and Jesse James.  When Ormond passed on the screenplay, Lewis retitled his screenplay Massacre Mountain and gave it to his agent Ilse Lahn Waitzerkorn who several years later leased his script to Constantin Film. The Germans used the screenplay to bring back Tony Kendall as Black Eagle from The Pirates of the Mississippi with his frequent film partner Brad Harris.  Joining Harris was his future wife Olga Schoberová who appeared with Harris in Massacre at Marble City.

Cast
 Brad Harris as Cliff/Clint McPhearson
 Horst Frank as Blade Carpenter
 Tony Kendall as Chief Black Eagle
 Pinkas Braun as Gentleman
 Joachim Hansen as Captain Jackson
 Werner Peters as Morton
 Ennio Girolami (as Thomas Moore) as Tom Howard/Slim James
 Edith Hancke as Cora Morton
 Joseph Egger as Buddy
 Serge Marquand as Brad Howard/Chet 'Blacky'James
 Olga Schoberová as Lana Miller
 Jacques Bézard (as Jackie Bezard) as Pasqual
 Ángel Ortiz as Sergeant
 Annie Giss as Madam
 Lorenzo Robledo as courier

Reception
Black Eagle of Santa Fe is considered a contemporary homage to the Karl May film adaptations.

References

External links
 

1965 films
West German films
1960s German-language films
German Western (genre) films
Italian Western (genre) films
1965 Western (genre) films
Spaghetti Western films
Films directed by Alberto Cardone
Constantin Film films
Films directed by Ernst Hofbauer
1960s Italian films
1960s German films